The Johan Skytte Prize in Political Science was established in 1995 by the Johan Skytte Foundation at Uppsala University. The foundation itself goes back to the donation in 1622 from Johan Skytte (1577–1645), politician and chancellor of the university, which established the Skyttean professorship of Eloquence and Government.

The prize, 500,000 Swedish kronor (approximately $52,000) is to be given "to the scholar who in the view of the Foundation has made the most valuable contribution to political science". Since its creation in 1995, the Johan Skytte Prize has garnered a prestigious reputation within the social science community, earning the nickname "the Nobel Prize for Political Science." According to reputation surveys conducted in 2013–2014 and 2018, it is the most prestigious international academic award in political science.

Recipients of the Johan Skytte Prize in Political Science

External links
 The Johan Skytte Prize in Political Science, official website

References 

Political science awards
Uppsala University
Political science organizations
Political science in Sweden
1995 establishments in Sweden
Awards established in 1995